The Malcolm Baronetcy, of Balbedie and Innertiel in the County of Fife, is a title in the Baronetage of Nova Scotia. It was created on 25 July 1666 for John Malcolm, subsequently Member of Parliament for Kinross-shire. He was the son of John Malcolm (1611–1692), of Balbedie, Lochore and Innertiel, a Member of the Scottish Parliament.

Alexander Malcolm, younger brother of the first Baronet, was a Senator of the College of Justice and Lord Justice Clerk under the judicial title of Lord Lochore.

Malcolm baronets, of Balbedie and Innertiel (1666)
Sir John Malcolm, 1st Baronet (1646–1729)
Sir John Malcolm, 2nd Baronet (1681–1753)
Sir Michael Malcolm, 3rd Baronet (died 1793)
Sir James Malcolm, 4th Baronet (died 1805)
Sir John Malcolm, 5th Baronet (1749–1816)
Sir Michael Malcolm, 6th Baronet (died 1828)
Sir John Malcolm, 7th Baronet (1828–1865)
Sir James Malcolm, 8th Baronet (1823–1901)
Sir James William Malcolm, 9th Baronet (1862–1927)
Sir Michael Albert James Malcolm, 10th Baronet (1898–1976)
Sir David Peter Michael Malcolm, 11th Baronet (1919–1995)
Sir James William Thomas Alexander Malcolm, 12th Baronet (1930–2012)
Sir Alexander James Elton Malcolm, 13th Baronet (born 1956)

See also
Clan Malcolm

Notes

References 
Kidd, Charles, Williamson, David (editors). Debrett's Peerage and Baronetage (1990 edition). New York: St Martin's Press, 1990, 

Malcolm
1666 establishments in Nova Scotia